The Hundred of Auld,  is a hundred in the County of Chandos, South Australia.

History
The traditional owners of the Hundred of Auld are the Ngargad Australian Aboriginal tribes.  The hundred was founded in 1912.

References

Auld